Two ships in the United States Navy have been named USS Varuna for Varuna, the Vedic god of oceans and rivers and keeper of the souls of the drowned.

 The first  was a screw gunboat launched in 1861 and sunk by enemy action in April 1862.
 The second  was a motorboat tender, commissioned in 1943 and decommissioned in 1946.

See also
 SS Varuna, a  American passenger/cargo steamer built in 1869 by Chas Mallory at Mystic, Connecticut for the Mallory Line that sank in 1870.

References

United States Navy ship names